The Armed Forces of the Slovak Republic were divided from the Czechoslovak army after dissolution of Czechoslovakia on 1 January 1993. Slovakia joined NATO on 29 March 2004. From 2006 the army transformed into a fully professional organization and compulsory military service was abolished. Slovak armed forces numbered 19,500 uniformed personnel and 4,208 civilians in 2022.

Ground forces

Ground Forces Command
1st Mechanized Brigade 
2nd Mechanized Brigade
Combat Service Support Brigade

Air force

The Slovak Air Force, officially the Air Force of the Armed Forces of the Slovak Republic, has been defending Slovak airspace since independence in 1993. The Slovak Air Force currently comprises one wing of fighters, one wing of utility helicopters, one wing of transport aircraft, and one SAM brigade. It operates around 20 combat aircraft, as well as 10 helicopters from 3 air bases: Malacky/Kuchyňa Air Base, Sliač Air Base, Prešov Air Base. The Air Force is currently part of the NATO Integrated Air and Missiles Defense System – NATINADS.

Special Operations Forces

 5th Special Forces Regiment
 52nd Airborne Battalion 
 CIMIC/PsyOps Center

In the future will be added Cyber Defence Unit and SOF Training base.

Missions
Slovakia has 169 military personnel deployed in Cyprus for UNFICYP United Nations led peace support operations. Slovakia has 41 troops deployed in Bosnia and Herzegovina for EUFOR Althea. Slovak troops were withdrawn from Kosovo because the Slovak Armed Forces set its priority to focus mainly on NATO led mission. Since the independence of Slovakia in 1993, there have been 60 uniformed personnel deaths in the line of service to the United Nations and NATO (as of 30 April 2018).

Gallery

References

External links 

Official homepage of the Ministry of Defence
Armed Forces of the Slovak Republic 

 
Permanent Structured Cooperation